Southwestern Bible College may refer to:

Southwestern Assemblies of God University, 1927 Waxahachie, Texas
Southwestern Christian University, 1946 Bethany, Oklahoma